Expo 2016 was an international horticultural exposition held in Antalya, Turkey. Under the aegis of the Bureau International des Expositions (BIE)  Expo 2016 Antalya was the first  International Horticultural Exhibition to be held in Turkey.

As Turkey’s first International Horticultural Expo, Expo 2016 Antalya was held from April 22 to October 30, 2016. Starting with the philosophy of “Cultivating a Green Life for Future Generations”, EXPO 2016 Antalya has adopted the theme of “Flowers and Children” along with the motto “A Green Life for Future Generations”. History, Bio-Diversity, Sustainability and Green Cities made up the four subthemes of EXPO 2016 Antalya.

Expo 2016 Antalya, which hosted national and international congresses, panels, meetings and seminars, also provided cultural and artistic activities for its guests. 8 million locals and foreign visitors visited EXPO 2016 Antalya over its 6-month duration. EXPO 2016 Antalya was held on a 112-hectare exhibit site in Aksu. EXPO 2016 Antalya aimed at being the start of a new way of thinking, the intoxicating scent of flowers and the laughter of children throughout the city bringing with it hopes for a greener world.

American singer-songwriter Demi Lovato performed at the exposition on October 1, 2016 as part of her Future Now Tour.

Participating countries
In addition to the hosts Antalya Turkey, the following countries participated: 
Azerbaijan, Bangladesh, Benin,
Bosnia and Herzegovina,
Bulgaria, 
Burundi,
Cameroon,
Comoros, China,
Democratic Republic of Congo, Eritrea, Ethiopia,
Georgia, Germany, 
Ghana, Guinea, 
Hong Kong,
Hungary,
India, Italy, Japan, Kazakhstan, Kenya, South Korea, Kosovo, North Korea, Madagascar,
Mauritania,  
Mexico, 
Moldova, Myanmar, Netherlands,
Niger, Nepal, 
Pakistan,
Palestine,  
Qatar, 
Congo, 
Senegal, 
Serbia, 
Sierra Leone, 
Somalia, South Africa, Sri Lanka, Sudan,
Tanzania,
Thailand,
Turkmenistan, Uganda,
Ukraine, United Kingdom,
Yemen,
Zimbabwe.

Pavilions
Germany Pavilion was represented by Martin Berlin, the Ambassador of Germany to Turkey. 

Myanmar Pavilion was represented by Levi Sap Nei Thang.

The Deputy Commissioner-General of the Qatar Pavilion Fayqa Ashkanani and designed by Fatima Fawzi. The design was inspired by the Sidra tree.

The Commissioner General of Expo 2016

The Ambassador  was the commission general of Expo 2016 Antalya.

Fairground
The cost of the investments made for the fair totalled to  1.7 billion (approximately US$ 600 million as of April 2016).

The facilities, which were built for the Expo 2016, were the Expo Tower, Turkey's first Agriculture and Biodiversity Museum, a congress center of 6,500 seating capacity, 5,000 and 800 seated two amphitheaters, a "Children Island" as playground and a "Science and Technology Center for Children". Further facilities were the Expo Pond, Expo Terrace in the form of peony, the symbol flower of the Expo 2016, Expo Hill, Expo Forest, Expo Square and "Culture and Arts Street" as well as restaurants.

Around 25,000 green plants of 120 species were planted in the fairground. The fair features also a 945-year old olive tree (Olea europaea).

Expo Tower

The Expo Tower was designed by architects Serdar Kızıltaş and Zeynep Melike Atay. It has the form of a three-leaved peony that resembles the three-arched Hadrian's Gate (literally: "The Three Gates"), a landmark of Antalya.

The tower is a -high structure situated at the western side of the fairground facing the main entrance. The exterior of the tower is covered 2/3 of its height by aluminium composite panel and the upper part by steel facia construction. It has two basement, one ground floor and 17 stories. Three elevators can lift up 63 visitors at the same time to the three-leaved peony-formed observation platform atop the tower.

Access

It was accessible by a light rail line, which was built as the extension of the existing public transportation system of Antalya. The -long line cost around  900 million (approx. US$ 318 million as of April 2016).

References

External links 
 Official website of the Bureau International des Expositions (BIE)
 EXPO 2016 Antalya official site
 EXPO 2016 Antalya ad at YouTube

International horticultural exhibitions
2016 in Turkey
Aksu District
Culture in Antalya
World's fairs in Turkey
Garden festivals in Turkey
Tourist attractions in Antalya
2016 festivals in Turkey
Horticulture in Turkey